Mirko Dorner (March 7, 1921 in Budapest – May 2, 2004 in Essen) was a German-Hungarian cellist, composer and painter, raised in Belgrade.

Dorner was trained at the Belgrade Conservatory and the Accademia Nazionale di Santa Cecilia (1939–42). He then returned to Belgrade, teaching at its Conservatory before settling in 1954 in Germany as the cello soloist at the Berlin Philharmonic and a professor at the Berlin University of the Arts and from 1965 at the Folkwang University of the Arts in Essen. In the meantime Dorner won the 1949 Concours de Geneve and the 1952 Vercelli's Viotti competition.

References
klassika.info

Hungarian classical cellists
Accademia Nazionale di Santa Cecilia alumni
1921 births
2004 deaths
20th-century classical musicians
Hungarian expatriates in Yugoslavia
Hungarian emigrants to Germany
20th-century cellists